Freshwater Bay can refer to:

Freshwater Bay (Western Australia)
Freshwater Bay, Barbados
Freshwater Bay, Newfoundland, bay near Gambo, Newfoundland and Labrador, Canada
Freshwater Bay, Isle of Wight, cove on the south coast of the Isle of Wight, England
Freshwater Bay, Portland, bay on the Isle of Portland, Dorset, England
Freshwater Bay (Alaska), US
Freshwater Bay (Washington), US